Keisuke (written: , , , , , , , , , , , , , , , ,  , , , , , , , ,  or ) is a masculine Japanese given name. Notable people with the name include:

, Japanese footballer
, Japanese general
, Japanese mixed martial artist
, Japanese footballer
, Japanese footballer
, Japanese footballer
, Japanese baseball player
, Japanese footballer
Keisuke Hoashi (born 1967), American actor
, Japanese footballer
, Japanese footballer
, Japanese actor and voice actor
, Japanese manga artist
, Japanese sumo wrestler
, Japanese physician and biologist
, Japanese swimmer
, Japanese footballer
, Japanese baseball player
, Japanese baseball player
, Japanese actor
, Japanese baseball player
, Japanese politician
, Japanese footballer
, Japanese film director
, Japanese actor
, Japanese photographer
, Japanese footballer
, Japanese-Korean racing driver
, Japanese footballer
, Japanese footballer
, Japanese musician and singer-songwriter
Keisuke Makino (born 1969), Japanese footballer
, Japanese footballer
, Japanese actor and singer
, Japanese footballer
, Japanese footballer
, Japanese rower
, Japanese footballer
, Japanese footballer
, Japanese musician
, Japanese admiral, politician and Prime Minister of Japan
, Japanese swimmer
, Japanese footballer
, Japanese footballer
, Japanese footballer
, Japanese military commander
, Japanese footballer
, Japanese water polo player
Keisuke Sawaki (born 1943), Japanese long-distance runner
, Japanese footballer
, Japanese textile designer
, Japanese footballer
, Japanese politician
, Japanese baseball player
, Japanese footballer
, Japanese politician
, Japanese table tennis player
, Japanese actor
, Japanese decathlete
, Japanese samurai
, Japanese film director and screenwriter
, Japanese swimmer

Fictional characters
, a character in the webtoon series Nar Doma
, a character in the video game Persona 3
Keisuke Itonokogiri (糸鋸 圭介), a character in the video game Ace Attorney
, a character in The Karate Kid series
{{Keisuke Baji,(場地 (バジ) 圭介 (けいすけ), a character in Tokyo Revenger, First division captain.

See also
Keisuke (puzzle), a logic puzzle

Japanese masculine given names